Eupithecia millesima is a moth in the family Geometridae. It is found in Kenya.

References

Moths described in 1994
millesima
Moths of Africa